Coptodactyla is a genus of Scarabaeidae or scarab beetles.

List of Species
 Coptodactyla brooksi Matthews, 1976
 Coptodactyla depressa Paulian, 1933
 Coptodactyla ducalis Blackburn, 1903
 Coptodactyla glabricollis Hope, 1842
 Coptodactyla lesnei Paulian, 1933
 Coptodactyla matthewsi Reid, 2000
 Coptodactyla merdeka Reid, 2000
 Coptodactyla meridionalis Matthews, 1976
 Coptodactyla monstrosa Felsche, 1909
 Coptodactyla nitida Paulian, 1933
 Coptodactyla onitoides Gillet, 1925
 Coptodactyla papua Lansberge, 1885
 Coptodactyla stereocera Gillet, 1911
 Coptodactyla storeyi Reid, 2000
 Coptodactyla subaenea Harold, 1877
 Coptodactyla torresica Mathews, 1976
 Coptodactyla tuberculata Gillet, 1925

References 

  Biolib
 Nomen at Animals

Scarabaeidae genera